Galole may refer to:

Galole language, spoken in East Timor
Hola, Kenya, a town also known as Galole